Zoltán Török (12 August 1899 – 12 February 1970) was a Hungarian rower. He competed at the 1924 Summer Olympics in Paris with the men's coxed four where they were eliminated in the round one repechage.

References

External links
 

1899 births
1970 deaths
Hungarian male rowers
Olympic rowers of Hungary
Rowers at the 1924 Summer Olympics
Rowers at the 1928 Summer Olympics
People from Harghita County
European Rowing Championships medalists